The 1975 UMass Minutemen football team represented the University of Massachusetts Amherst in the 1975 NCAA Division II football season as a member of the Yankee Conference in NCAA Division II. The team was coached by Dick MacPherson and played its home games at Alumni Stadium in Hadley, Massachusetts. UMass finished the season with a record of 8–2 overall and 4–1 in conference play.

Schedule

References

UMass
UMass Minutemen football seasons
Umass Minutemen football